The composer Ferruccio Busoni produced a large number of adaptations, transcriptions, and editions of works by other composers. He also wrote a number of cadenzas for compositions by other composers. This article presents a complete catalog of these works.

For a complete list of original compositions see Catalog of original compositions by Ferruccio Busoni. For a more selective list of recorded works, see Ferruccio Busoni discography (as composer).

Cadenzas and transcriptions 

The letters BV B (Busoni-Verzeichnis Bearbeitung [Busoni Catalog Adaptation]) followed by a number are used for the identification of Busoni's cadenzas and transcriptions. The BV B numbers are based on the first comprehensive catalog of Busoni's works prepared by Kindermann. The letters KiV B are also sometimes used. Although Kindermann himself did not specify any letter(s) to be used for referring to his catalog, he has agreed to the use of the abbreviation BV. The dates of composition are from Kindermann and Roberge. For many transcriptions, the date of composition could not be ascertained, and a date "at the latest" was used. This date was determined by the date of publication or first performance, or by some other means. These dates are marked with an asterisk (＊).

Abbreviations: acc., according to; arr., arrangement; SB, Staatsbibliothek zu Berlin; B&H, Breitkopf & Härtel, Leipzig (unless otherwise indicated); cat., catalog; ded., dedicated to; dur., duration; frag, fragment; fp, first performance; (score) or (♫), link to the score of Busoni's adaptation at the International Music Score Library Project; instr., instrumentation; MS, manuscript; pub., published; rev., revised; transcr., transcription or transcribed; unpub., unpublished.

Cadenzas (BV B 1 to 19) 
Note: This section is not yet complete. The "Details" column needs additional work.

Transcriptions (BV B 20 to 115) 
Note: This section is not yet complete. The "Details" column needs additional work.
These works are transcribed for piano solo, unless otherwise indicated.

Klavierübung 

The Klavierübung is a compilation of exercises, transcriptions, and original compositions by Busoni, with which he hoped to pass on his accumulated knowledge of keyboard technique. It was issued in five parts between 1918 and 1922, and a second edition was published posthumously in 1925.

Bach Editions 

Busoni's Bach editions are a series of publications containing primarily transcriptions of keyboard music by Johann Sebastian Bach. They also include performance suggestions, practice exercises, musical analysis, an essay on the art of transcribing Bach's organ music for piano, an analysis of the fugue from Beethoven's 'Hammerklavier' sonata, and other related material. The later editions also include free adaptations and original compositions by Busoni which are based on the music of Bach.

Liszt Editions 
In the 1890s Busoni began to study Liszt's scores more intensively, including them more and more in his concert performances and collecting an extensive library of Liszt editions. By 1900 even Liszt's pupils were beginning to declare Busoni a true disciple. His reputation as a Liszt scholar and advocate grew to such an extent that in 1907 Busoni was invited to join the editorial board appointed to oversee to the publication of Liszt's collected works. Between 1901 and 1936 the Franz Liszt-Stiftung [Franz Liszt Foundation] supervised the publication (by Breitkopf & Härtel) of 34 volumes. Of these, Busoni edited three: II.1, II.2, and II.3. These three consist of the studies S.136–145 and  S.420. The goal of the Liszt-Stiftung edition was scholarly, and Busoni adhered faithfully to this policy. Only in Volume II.1 did he even include any ossias, each labelled with "F.B." in small print.

Franz Liszt-Stiftung Edition 
 Franz Liszt Musikalische Werke. Herausgegeben von der Franz Liszt-Stiftung. II. Pianofortewerke. Etüden für Pianoforte zu zwei Händen. Bd. 1–3 [Franz Liszt Musical Works. Published by the Franz Liszt Foundation. Etudes for piano two hands. Vols. 1–3.]
•Note: The English titles listed under contents are from the original edition. The title information in parenthesis is not part of the original title and is provided for reference only.

Volume II.1:
Leipzig: Breitkopf & Härtel; n.d. (1910?); cat. no. F.L. 32-34; (10 pages foreword; 157 pages score).
•Note: Busoni wrote the foreword which is dated 1910.
•Contents:
Study in 12 exercises Op. 1 (first version of Transcendental Etudes, S.136)
12 great Studies (second version of Transcendental Etudes, S.137)
Mazeppa (first version, S.138)

Volume II.2:
Leipzig: Breitkopf & Härtel; [1911]; cat. no. F.L. 35-36; (129 pages score; 2 pages of notes by Busoni).
•Contents:
Bravour-Studies (final version of Transcendental Etudes, S.139)
Great Fantasia di Bravura on Paganini's Campanella, Op. 2 (Grande Fantaisie de bravoure sur La Clochette, S.420)

Volume II.3:
Leipzig: Breitkopf & Härtel; n.d. (1911?); cat. no. F.L. 37-43; (4 pages editor's note; 155 pages score).
•Note: The editor's note is dated December 1911.
•Contents:
Bravour-Studies after Paganini's Caprices (first version of Paganini Etudes, S.140)
Grand Etudes after Paganini (final versions, S.141)
Morceau de Salon, Etude of Perfection from the Method of Methods (early version of Ab Irato, S.142)
Ab Irato, Great Etude of Perfection (final version, S.143)
Three Concert Studies (S.144)
Gnome-Dance (No. 2 of S.145)
In the Woods (No. 1 of S.145)

•Ref: Kindermann, p. 467; Sitsky, pp. 215–216; Roberge, p. 63.

Paganini Etudes 
 Sechs Paganini Etüden für Klavier. Revidierte Ausgabe von Ferruccio Busoni [Six Paganini Etudes for Piano. Revised edition by Ferruccio Busoni]
Leipzig: Breitkopf & Härtel; [1912]; cat. no. E.B. 484; (43 pages). Also published separately as cat. nos. 2551-56 (9, 8, 11, 4, 7, and 11 pages, respectively).
•Note: This scholarly edition of Liszt's definitive versions (S.141) is reprinted exactly as in Vol. II.3 of the Stiftung edition. These versions should not be confused with Busoni's concert arrangements of the same works in which Liszt's music has sometimes been significantly altered and which have been assigned the catalog numbers BV B 75 (No. 1), BV B 70 (No. 2), BV B 68 (No. 3), BV B 74 (No. 4), BV B 76 (No. 5), and BV B 67 (No. 6).
•Ref: Kindermann, p. 467; Sitsky, p. 216; Roberge, p. 63.

Selected Piano Works 
 Ausgewählte Klavierwerke aus den von der Franz Liszt-Stiftung herausgegebenen Musikalischen Werken Franz Liszts, herausgegeben von Ferruccio Busoni [Selected Piano Works from the Franz Liszt Musical Works published by the Franz Liszt Foundation, edited by Ferruccio Busoni]
Leipzig: Breitkopf & Härtel; [1917]; cat. nos. E.B. 5011 (9 pages); 5013 (11 pages); 5017 (9 pages); 5019 (11 pages); 5022 (9 pages).
•Contents:
Abendklänge (Harmonies du soir, No. 11 of the final version of Transcendental Etudes, S.139)
La Campanella (Paganini Etude No. 3 in G-sharp minor, S.141)
Gnomenreigen (Gnome-Dance, S.145)
Konzertetüde Nr. 3 in Des-Dur (Concert Etude No.3 in D-flat major, S.144)
Waldesrauschen (Forest Murmurs, No. 1 of Two Concert Studies, S.145)
•Ref: Kindermann, p. 467.

Dover reprints 
The Searle numbers and other information following the page numbers are not part of the original Dover Contents, and are added here for reference.

 Complete Etudes for Solo Piano, Series I: Including the Transcendental Etudes. Edited by Ferruccio Busoni
New York: Dover Publications, 1988. 
•Note: Reprint of Vol. II.1 and the first part of Vol. II.2 (S.139) of the Franz Liszt Stiftung edition.

•Contents:

Foreword, pp. v–xi. (by Ferruccio Busoni, Berlin, 1910; translated into English by Rosamond Ley)

Editorial Notes, pp. xiii–xv. (by Ferruccio Busoni; translated into English by Rosamond Ley)

Etude en 12 Exercises [Etude in 12 Exercises], Op. 1 (1826), pp. 1–33.  (S.136) (score)
No. 1 in C Major, 1. No. 2 in A Minor, 3. No. 3 in F Major, 5. No. 4 in D Minor, 8. No. 5 in B-flat Major, 10. No. 6 in G Minor, 14. No. 7 in E-flat Major, 16. No. 8 in C Minor, 18. No.9 in A-flat Major, 21. No. 10 in F Minor, 24. No. 11 in D-flat Major, 27. No. 12 in B-flat Minor, 31.

12 Grandes Etudes [12 Large Etudes] (1837) (dedicated to Carl Czerny), pp. 34–149. (S.137) (score)
No. 1 in C Major, 34. No. 2 in A minor, 36. No. 3 in F Major, 41. No. 4 in D Minor, 46. No. 5 in B-flat Major, 58. No. 6 in G Minor, 68. No. 7 in E-flat Major, 78. No. 8 in C Minor, 88. No. 9 in A-flat Major, 105. No. 10 in F Minor, 116. No. 11 in D-flat Major, 128. No. 12 in B-flat Minor, 139.

Mazeppa (1840) (dedicated to Victor Hugo, pp. 150–147. (S.138) (score)

Etudes d'Exécution Transcendante [Etudes for Transcendental Technique, or Transcendental Etudes] (1851) (dedicated to Carl Czerny, pp. 158–255. (S.139) (score)
1: Preludio (C major), 158. 2: (A minor), 160. 3: Paysage [Landscape] (F Major), 165. 4: Mazeppa (D minor), 168. 5: Feux Follets [Will-o'-the-Wisp] (B-flat major), 181. 6: Vision (G minor), 190. 7: Eroica (E-flat major), 200. 8: Wilde Jagd [Wild Hunt] (C minor), 206. 9: Ricordanza [Remembrance] (A-flat major), 217. 10: (F minor), 228. 11: Harmonies du Soir [Evening Harmonies] (D-flat major), 238. 12: Chasse-Neige [Snow-Drifting Wind] (B-flat minor), 246.

 Complete Etudes for Solo Piano, Series II: Including the Paganini Etudes and Concert Etudes. Edited by Ferruccio Busoni
New York: Dover Publications, 1988. 
•Note: Reprint of the second part of Vol. II.2 (S.420) and Vol. II.3 of the Franz Liszt Stiftung edition.

•Contents:

Editorial Notes, pp. v–vii. (by Ferruccio Busoni; translated into English by Rosamond Ley)

"Grande Fantaisie de Bravoure sur La Clochette de Paganini [Large Bravura Fantasy on Paganini's La Campanella], Op. 2 (1832)", pp. 1–30. (S.420) (score)

Etudes d'Exécution Transcendante d'après Paganini [Etudes for Transcendental Technique after Paganini] (1838) (dedicated to Clara Schumann), pp. 31–90. (S.140) (score)
Preludio, 31. 1 (G minor), 32. 2 (E-flat major), 43. 3: La Campanella (A-flat minor/major), 51. 4 (E major) Version I, 59; Version II, 65. 5: La Chasse [The Hunt] (E major), 72. 6: Theme and Variations (A minor), 81.

Grandes Etudes de Paganini [Paganini Etudes] (dedicated to Clara Schumann), pp. 91–132. (S.141) (score)
1 (G minor), 91. 2 (E-flat major), 99. 3: La Campanella (G-sharp minor), 106. 4 (E major), 115. 5: La Chasse (E major), 118. 6 (A minor), 123.

Morceau de Salon: Etude de Perfectionnement [Salon Piece: Finishing Etude] (1840), pp. 133–136. (S.142) (score)

Ab Irato: Grande Etude de Perfectionnement [Ab Irato: Large Finishing Etude] (1852), pp. 137–143. (S.143) (score)

Trois Etudes de Concert [Three Concert Etudes] (c. 1848) (dedicated to Eduard Liszt), pp. 143–168. (S.144) (score)
No. 1 in A-flat Major, 143. No. 2 in F Minor, 152. No. 3 in D-flat major, 160.

Two Concert Etudes (c. 1862–63) (dedicated to Dionys Pruckner), pp. 169–184. (S.145) (score)
Gnomenreigen [Dance of the Gnomes], 169. Waldesrauschen [Forest Rustling], 177.

Biographical notes 
 Eduard Liszt (1817–1879), the youngest son of Franz Liszt's grandfather and the stepbrother of Franz Liszt's father. Eduard handled Franz Liszt's business affairs for more than thirty years until Eduard's death in 1879.
 Rosamond Ley (1883–1969), was a pianist and writer on music. She translated Busoni's Letters to his Wife and The Essence of Music into English.

Notes 

* The date of composition could not be ascertained, and a date "at the latest" is used (Roberge, p. xix).

References 
Beaumont, Antony (1985). Busoni the Composer. London: Faber and Faber. 
Beaumont, Antony, ed. (1987). Busoni: Selected Letters. New York: Columbia University Press. 
Dent, Edward J. (1933). Ferruccio Busoni: A Biography, London: Oxford University Press. (Reprint: London: Ernst Eulenberg, 1974) 
Kindermann, Jürgen (1980). Thematisch-chronologisches Verzeichnis der musikalischen Werke von Ferruccio B. Busoni. Studien zur Musikgeschichte des 19. Jahrhunderts, vol. 19. Regensburg: Gustav Bosse Verlag. 
Prinz, Ulrich (1970). Ferruccio Busoni als Klavierkomponist. Stuttgart: Polyphoto Dr. Vogt. Originally Ph.D. diss. Ruprecht-Karl-Universität, Heidelberg. (Cited in Beaumont, 1985, p. 384; Roberge, 1991, pp. xi, 309; Sitsky, 2008, p. 402.)
Roberge, Marc-André (1991). Ferruccio Busoni: a bio-bibliography. New York: Greenwood Press. 
Schnapp, Friedrich (1928). Katalog der im Nachlaß vorhandeden Musik-Manuskripte Ferruccio Busonis, 1873-1924. Typescript. Berlin State Library, Busoni Archive. (Cited in Beaumont, 1985, p. 355; Roberge, 1991, pp. xi, 143.)
Sitsky, Larry (2008). Busoni and the Piano. The Works, the Writings, and the Recordings. (2nd ed.) Hillsdale, NY: Pendragon Press.  [First edition, Westport: Greenwood Press,1986. ]